Barga was an ancient city and later kingdom in the Syrian Coastal Mountain Range in the Bronze age and Iron age.

Middle Bronze
In the Middle Bronze, Parga/Barga was a contested city between Yamhad and Qatna near Hamath.

Late Bronze
Barga was a city-state in the Amarna letters period of 1350-1335 BC and later. It is mentioned as the "land of Barga" by Mursilis II in treaties, (see Habiru). The Amarna letters correspondence is composed of 382 clay 'tablet-letters', the majority written to the pharaoh of Ancient Egypt, and Barga is only referenced in the subcorpus letters authored by Akizzi, the Prince of Qatna.

The region was generally southwest of Aleppo, in the neighborhood of other kingdoms, such as Nuhašše, Niya, and others. In the Amarna letters, Barga is referenced only in one damaged letter, (EA 57, EA for 'el Amarna'), when referencing the "king of Barga" and "Akizzi, king of Qatna".

See also
Amarna letters
Habiru
Nuhašše, Niya (kingdom), relative kingdoms
Akizzi, Prince of Qatna
Amarna letters–localities and their rulers

References
Moran, William L. The Amarna Letters. Johns Hopkins University Press, 1987, 1992. (softcover)

Amarna letters locations